FMEP is an EP by American metal band Fireball Ministry. The first three songs also appear on the band's second studio album The Second Great Awakening, while the remaining songs are covers.

"Muscle of Love" was originally performed by Alice Cooper, "Victim of Changes" was originally performed by Judas Priest. "Fortunes" appears on Blue Explosion: A Tribute to Blue Cheer. "Cough/Cool" appears on Graven Images: A Tribute to the Misfits. "Movin' Out" appears on Right in the Nuts: A Tribute to Aerosmith.

Track listing

References

2001 EPs
Fireball Ministry albums